Fayette County Courthouse is a historic courthouse located at Fayetteville, Fayette County, West Virginia. It was built in 1894–1895, and is a 2 1/2 story, five bay wide, rectangular building with projecting wings.  The basement level is built of sandstone and faced in ashlar.  Above that, the walls are of brick.  It features a square tower with pyramidal roof.

It was listed on the National Register of Historic Places in 1978.

References

External links

Courthouses on the National Register of Historic Places in West Virginia
Government buildings completed in 1895
Buildings and structures in Fayette County, West Virginia
County courthouses in West Virginia
Romanesque Revival architecture in West Virginia
National Register of Historic Places in Fayette County, West Virginia
Fayetteville, West Virginia